The following is a partial list of Recorded Texas Historic Landmarks (RTHLs) arranged by county as designated by the Texas Historical Commission and local county historical commissions in Texas. This page includes RTHLs in the following counties: Hunt, Hutchinson, Irion, Jack, Jackson, Jasper, Jeff Davis, Jefferson, Jim Hogg, Jim Wells, Johnson, Jones, Karnes, Kaufman, Kendall, Kenedy, Kent, Kerr, Kimble, King, Kinney, Kleberg, Knox, La Salle, Lamar, Lamb, Lampasas, Lavaca, Lee, Leon, Liberty, Limestone, Lipscomb, Live Oak, Llano, Loving, Lubbock, Lynn, Madison, Marion, and Martin.

KEY 

Landmarks with multiple historic designations are colored according to their highest designation within the following hierarchy.

Hunt County

Hutchinson County

Irion County

Jack County

Jackson County

Jasper County

Jeff Davis County

Jefferson County

Jim Hogg County

Jim Wells County

Johnson County

Jones County

Karnes County

Kaufman County

Kendall County

Kenedy County

Kent County

Kerr County

Kimble County

King County

Kinney County

Kleberg County

Knox County

La Salle County

Lamar County

Lamb County

Lampasas County

Lavaca County

Lee County

Leon County

Liberty County

Limestone County

Lipscomb County

Live Oak County

Llano County

Loving County

Lubbock County

Lynn County

Madison County

Marion County

Martin County

See also

References

External links

 (Hunt-Martin)
Landmarks (Hunt-Martin)